Alcathous is a monotypic genus containing the species Alcathous fecialis: a fulgorid planthopper, in the subfamily Amyclinae and found in southern India. It is predominantly brown with dark markings. Its snout curves slightly upward, and its wings are about 3 cm long and hide its short abdomen. From its eyes to the tip of its abdomen, A. fecialis is about 1.2 cm long with a 0.3 cm snout.

References

Insects of India
Auchenorrhyncha genera
Fulgoridae